Toh is a surname in various cultures.

Origins
Toh may be:
 A spelling of the Cantonese pronunciation of the Chinese surname spelled in Mandarin Pinyin as Dù
 A spelling of the Hokkien pronunciation of the Chinese surname spelled in Mandarin Pinyin as Zhuó
 An alternative spelling of the Korean surname spelled in the Revised Romanisation of Korean as Do

Statistics
Toh was the 17th-most common surname among ethnic Chinese in Singapore as of 1997 (ranked by English spelling, rather than by Chinese characters). Roughly 25,300 people, or 1.0% of the Chinese Singaporean population at the time, bore the surname Toh.

According to the 2000 South Korean census, there were 54,779 people in 16,952 households with the surname spelled Do in Revised Romanization. This surname is only infrequently spelled as Toh in South Korea: in a study based on a sample of applications for South Korean passports in 2007, only 1.1% of applicants chose to spell it as Toh in the Latin alphabet, against 86.9% who chose to spell it as Do, and 9.7% as Doh.

According to statistics cited by Patrick Hanks, there were 154 people on the island of Great Britain and seven on the island of Ireland with the surname Toh as of 2011.

The 2010 United States Census found 445 people with the surname Toh, making it the 47,614th-most-common name in the country, up from 279 (66,274th-most-common) in the 2000 Census. In both censuses, slightly more than three-quarters of the bearers of the surname identified as Asian American, and between 10% and 15% as African American.

People
People with the surname Toh include:

Chinese surname 卓
 Toh Ah Boon (1860–1932), Singaporean landlord
 Toh Kian Chui (1927–2000), Singaporean construction industry businessman
 Patsy Toh (born 1940), Chinese pianist based in the United Kingdom
 Toh Guo'An (born 1982), Singaporean footballer
 Toh Hong Huat (born 1974; disappeared in 1986), Singaporean student who went missing at age 12

Chinese surname 杜
 Toh Chin Chye (1921–2012), Singaporean politician
 Toh Aik Choon (1927–1990), Singaporean shipbuilding industry businessman 
 Sylvia Toh (born 1946/1947), Singaporean newspaper columnist
 Toh Wei Soong (born 1998), Singaporean swimmer
 Toh Ee Wei (born 2000), Malaysian badminton player

Other or unknown
People with another surname spelled Toh, or whose surnames as written in Chinese characters are not available:
 Somdej Toh (1788–1872), Thai Buddhist monk
 Boniface Hie Toh (born 1936), Ivorian boxer
 Kerstin Lindblad-Toh (born 1970), Swedish geneticist
 Terry Toh (born 1974), Singaporean chess master
 Toh Hsien Min (born 1975), Singaporean poet
 Peter Toh (born 1981), American musician
 Daryl Toh (born 1986), Malaysian comic book artist
 Joanna Toh (born 1996), Singaporean netball player
 Toh Kai Wei (born 1996), Singaporean netball player
 Nicholle Toh (born 2001), Singaporean swimmer
 Chai Keong Toh, Singaporean computer scientist
 Kim-Chuan Toh, Singaporean mathematician

References

Chinese-language surnames
Korean-language surnames
Cantonese-language surnames
Hokkien-language surnames
Multiple Chinese surnames